Go Go Squid! is a Chinese e-sport romance comedy television series directed by Li Qingrong and Xiang Xujing. The series was first aired in 2019, starring Yang Zi and Li Xian. It was an adaptation of Mo Bao Fei Bao's novel "Honey Stewed Squid." The series aired on Dragon TV and Zhejiang TV and was broadcast simultaneously on iQiyi and Tencent Video from July 9 to July 31, 2019.

The series is about Tong Nian, a talented computer science major and popular online singer, and Han Shangyan, a cybersecurity professional, who fall in love, support each other, and compete in international cybersecurity competitions. The series was the most-streamed series in 2019, and according to statistics from Yien Broadcasting Index TV series list, Go Go Squid! was the best domestic Chinese TV series in 2019.

There will be a sequel starring Hu Yitian and Li Yitong.

Plot summary
Tong Nian, an intelligent school girl, meets Han Shangyan, a passionate young man, who had dedicated his life to winning a world championship for China. Even though Han has a deep sense of responsibility to his teammates, he has trouble communicating and expressing his emotions. With Tong's understanding and support, Han gradually begins to open up to his brothers and family members. The two support and encourage each other as they work towards their dream to win a championship. Along the way, they motivate others to pursue their dreams as well. Throughout the series, Tong and Han display an unrelenting belief in their country, which is often interpreted as the patriotic power of contemporary young people.

Casts and Characters

Tong Nian (her highness Squid/ little squid)
Portrayed by Yang Zi.

Tong Nian is a talented computer science major who is also a popular online singer. She is described as optimistic, cheerful, soft, and cute. She is also very obedient, attentive, and sensible. She attends the youth class at university and has the same high IQ as the male lead Han Shangyan. After she falls in love with Han Shangyan at first sight, she chooses to take the initiative to pursue a relationship with him. Although Tong Nian loves Han Shangyan a lot, she also continues to pursue her interests and friendships while building a relationship with him. She also pursues her dream of developing an AI-based software, as well as facial recognition programs for the police and medical programs for hospitals.

Han Shangyan (Gun)
Portrayed by Li Xian.

Han Shangyan is a computer genius and high-level e-sports idol. He was originally the only investor and main member of the Solo team. Has won more than ten international championships, including multiple personal world rankings, the most dominant player with two MVP. After exiting the team, he established the K & K club. His dream is to take the club's young players to attack the world champion of cybersecurity CTF competitions. Other than that, he has nothing else in his eyes. In the eyes of his teammates, he is "the boss who is not close to women".

He is determined to fulfill his dreams and sticks to his beliefs, but he has some difficulties expressing himself to the outside world. Maintaining a sense of vigilance and distance, he has great pride in his family's native country. Han Shangyan grew up with his grandfather and stepmother, who loved him. His parents passed away when he was young and he missed out on a lot of family interaction. Parents' feelings are different. Father's words and lessons, and the company of his mother, can make a person's character grow fully, and Han was deprived of all of this. As a prince of ice, he is very good at many things. Maintaining indifference and vigilance, he developed a meticulous and serious attitude towards life. And this is exactly what his family left him with. His “don’t care” about anything other than work attitude is in stark contrast to his fanatical pursuit of career ideals; privately, he secretly covers the players’ with quilts and cares about their lives. He has fascinated a lot of girls, but he has not been interested in dating.

Wu Bai(DT) 
Portrayed by Hu Yitian.

Wu Bai (DT) is the captain of the K & K team, The strongest player domestically, and also an excellent computer genius. His dream and persistence is winning the worldwide championship with his teammates.

Mi Shaofei(Xiao Mi) 
Portrayed by Li Hongqi

Mi Shao Fei (Xiao Mi) is the original solo team all-rounder, the team was disbanded to go home to take care of the kiosk, then invited by Wang Hao to make a comeback, but announced his retirement due to unsatisfactory results, and finally became the leader of the k&k team.

Wang Hao(Solo) 
Portrayed by Li zefeng

Wang Hao was the original SOLO team captain, and Han Shangyan was his good brother, aspiring to win the CTF championship for China. But ten years ago Wang Hao chose to leave the team because of the sudden appearance of his ex-girlfriend Su Cheng with his daughter Ai, and Han Shangyan announced his retirement and the SOLO team was disbanded. However, Han Shangyan began to melt because of Tong Nian's appearance, and the relationship between Wang Hao and Han Shangyan also changed in the constant cooperation, and eventually reconciled.

Su Cheng 
Portrayed by Wang Lejun

Su Cheng was the first love of the former SOLO team captain Wang Hao. The two eventually broke up because of their feelings, but Su Cheng secretly gave birth to her daughter Xiao Ai, and then gave her daughter to Wang Hao for raising because she cannot afford her daughter any more. Later, she became the leader of the Han Shangyan Club K & K, and founded the K & K Club China Branch with Han Shangyan.

Ai Qing (Appledog) 
Portrayed by Wang Zhener

Ai Qing is the ex -girlfriend of the SOLO team captain Wang Hao, and just like Han Shangyan, Xiao Mi, Ou Qiang, and Wang Hao, she is a member of SOLO. Due to the appearance of Wang Hao's illegitimate daughter, the relationship with Wang Hao finally withdrawn from the team, which led the Han Shangyan to retire, and the SOLO team indirectly disbanded. Han Shangyan's cousin Wu Bai likes Ai Qing.

Sun Yaya 
Portrayed by Jiang Yanyao

Tong Nian's best friend. Mi Shaofei's girlfriend.

Production

Development
It is reported that the K & K club shed has an area of more than 2,000 square meters, and the construction time took 1.5 months. There are training facilities, meeting rooms and other venues inside. It is equipped with dozens of professional competition equipment and includes all kinds of basic living facilities, strive to restore the real club environment in every detail. The crew also shot the live moments of the characters and the team through more than 100 live shots of the location. To cultivate teammates' team tacit understanding and deepen the actor's understanding of the role, before the shooting, the crew specially conducted closed performance training and professional skills training, which made the team atmosphere shown in the play harmonious.

Filming
Fang Ying, vice-president of Huace/Croton Media, whose Gcoo Entertainment arm produced Go Go Squid!, said the series was conceived in 2014 and took more than 20 weeks to shoot. Li revealed that he was filming in Hengdian, when the staff recommended the novel and script of Go Go Squid! to him. Li accepted the offer because he thought that the character has a lot in common with him, right perseverance in work and dreams, just like his attitude towards his career as an actor. When he first came on set for filming, he had hurt his back from Sword Dynasty production. He couldn't walk properly at the start of filming.
The series began filming in April 2018 and finished on July 28, 2018, at Sanya.

Marketing
On February 14, 2018, officials announced that Yang Zi and Li as male and female protagonists. On March 19, 2018, Guan Xuanhu starred in one day, and Li Hongqi and Li Zefeng joined the play. On April 11, 2018, the full-length animated concept film was released followed by a still photo of the male and female protagonists On April 14, 2018. On May 20, 2018, the Honey Juice 520 Challenge was launched, and the actors in the show appeared separately. On June 11, 2018, the "dream as wings" version of the poster was exposed, and the image of the K & K team was presented to the audience for the first time followed by the personal posters of the characters On June 14, 2018. On July 14, 2018, the interview video of the male and female protagonists was released. On July 31, 2018, the first film flower officially released.

Design
The K & K team uniforms are also designed and customized by designers. There are more than ten types of uniforms. Han Shangyan's clothing is kept mainly black, simple, and elegant.

Reception

Television ratings

During the premiere broadcast of the series, the average ratings of the two stations were only 0.7%. However, Go Go Squid! topped television ratings in its timeslot.

The series dominated media data performance on the Guduo TV series list, Cat's Eye data TV series list, Yien Broadcasting Index TV series list, Yunhe Data series popularity list, Weibo TV series list, etc. During the launch of Go Go Squid!, Cateye Media Matrix released more than 200 related short videos on Douyin, and the cumulative playback reached more than 500 million. It generated a huge online buzz, with the show's official hashtag being viewed more than 12 billion times on Sina Weibo. According to the statistics of micro-hotspot wrd.cn, the TV series that first broadcast on TV stations and online video platforms in July 2019. The network transmission popularity index of TV series, main actors, and main characters from July 1 to July 31, Go Go Squid! ranked first in all categories; the hottest premiere TV series with network communication popularity index of 64.54; the hottest actors and actress (Li Xian and Yang Zi) with communication popularity index 55.73 and 53.06 respectively; as well as the hottest male and female character (Han Shangyan and Tong Nian) with communication popularity index 53.31 and 49.57. The series was also on the top of a poll conducted by The Beijing News on the most popular Chinese TV series of the summer, the results of which were published on July 31. According to iQiyi, the series is its second most popular show after last year's period drama and mega-hit, Story of Yanxi Palace. In 2019, the series was the most-streamed series in the three major video platforms; iQIYI, Tencent Video and Youku. According to the report data of the Cat's Eyes series, the series ranked first in the comprehensive search popularity list of the three major platforms of Baidu, Weibo and WeChat. And according to statistics from Yien Broadcasting Index TV series list, Go Go Squid! is the best domestic drama in 2019.

In Go Go Squid!, Han Shanyang is a male professional in the cybersecurity competition CTF (Internet Security Capture the Flag Station), which brought niche cybersecurity-related topics into public view. Chen Xiaoyuan the captain team of CTF admitted it, and praised Han Shanyang's positive energy for his perseverance, and struggle for dreams. And he found that the opening theme of the TV series is exactly what they feel like a real CTF player.

Following the popularity of the drama, major universities in China have started school one after another, and they have hung up the banners of Go Go Squid! to welcome the new students.

Critical response
Go Go Squid! received an average rating of 6.6/10 at Douban, and 7.8/10 at IMDb. For Li Xian's performance, the audience generally praised his acting skills online, but the lines were a little bit procrastinated, such as saying that the lines seemed to contain something, and the lines were too slow. In this regard, Li Xian admitted that the rhythm of his speech is a bit slow, and it was specially designed for the character after communicating with the filming team. Despite this, Li Xian still admitted that he did feel the shortcomings of his lines when watching the drama. Liu Wei of The Beijing News praised the plot setting, which is different from the past youth romance dramas. The love of Go Go Squid! expresses delicate and true emotions, conveys the positive energy of sunshine and youth, and does not add some sad links in the plot setting. There are not too many "dog blood" plots in the other sidelines, and there are no male second silently waiting, female second spoiler and bad mother-in-law who break up the couple. In addition, Jia Miao of Oriental Network also praised the positive energy of the series, the way it tells all aspects of young people's lives in a simple but peaceful way, and the small details which inadvertently touched the audience. She is even looking forward to more urban positive energy TV shows like Go Go Squid!.

Lili Pang of Oriental Network also praised the actors for their vivid interpretation of the characters, especially Li's performance, writing "I feel that Li Xian is still a very promising boy. In this drama, due to the role setting, there is no big explosion and no famous scenes, but Li Xian's performance is still excellent. I feel that this person can handle more complicated and deep roles." People's Daily praised the writer for the setting of the characters which is different from another youth theme drama, and also praised the plot's precise outline and meticulous description that showed the young people's living conditions and mental outlook, as well as actively contacts the frontier areas of concern for the current young audience.

Accolades

Release

Broadcast
The series premiered from July 9, 2019, until July 31, 2019, and was broadcast simultaneously on Zhejiang TV, Dragon TV, iQiyi, and Tencent. Released on Netflix in February 2020, Indonesia, Thailand, India, Malaysia through We TV, other countries on Rakuten Viki, My Dramalist, as well as YouTube.

Controversy
When the play was broadcast, a full collection of resources unexpectedly appeared online, and many unbroadcast plots were leaked in advance. Because the watermark of the leaked film reads "Only for viewing by Dragon TV ", netizens left a message in the official Weibo of Dragon TV, but Dragon TV has not responded.

The series was embroiled in a controversy after a map was seen in episode 39 that left off the self-ruled island of Taiwan and southern Hainan, and incorrectly represented the India-Tibet border, the South China Sea and the Kashmir region. According to the ministry, mistakes on the map used in the teleplay include that it incorrectly delineated the boundaries of the southern areas of the Tibet autonomous region, the colors for Taiwan and Hainan islands were different from other parts of China; and the dotted line to indicate Chinese islands in the South China Sea was missing. The issue has since been investigated by China's Ministry of Natural Resources. On August 12, the production company was fined RMB 100,000 (US$14,100) by Shanghai Municipality Planning and Natural Resources Bureau.

Soundtrack
"The Unknown Generation" is the theme song of the drama. The wind echoes the plot very much. In addition to telling love stories between couples, the TV series also tells a group of young people working hard for seemingly unremarkable dreams, occupations, and hobbies. Compared with national athletes and international superstars, e-sports players may be "unknown people," but this group of young people choose to ignore everyone's colored vision, insist on pursuing their dreams, and win glory for the country. The songs are composed by Tang Hanxiao.

"Couldn't Leave" is the only English episode, sung by a Kazakh male singer, Dimash. The lyrics are simple, but the love is profound. "So many times I wish I could leave", tells that someone in the play wants to give up, but because of a kind of power (in the play is a group of brothers working hard together), that person persevered. The singer sang freely, which made the audience worried.

Songs expressing love include "Milk Bread" and "Happiness Walking Together".

"Milk Bread," sung by Yang Zi, peak at 2 on Billboard China Social Chart. Li also participated in the soundtrack title "For the Future (Gei Wei Lai)". The singing voice is similar to his interpretation of Han Shangyan, which is convergent and low-key, seemingly absent. Even when it comes to the climax in the play or song, it expresses everything with a calm and mature character. In the middle part of the song is a child's voice. The song peak at 7 on Billboard China Social Chart and Billboard China Top 100.

Notes

References

External links 
 
 
 

 

2019 Chinese television series debuts
2019 Chinese television series endings
Chinese romantic comedy television series
Television shows based on Chinese novels
Television series by Croton Media
Esports television series
Zhejiang Television original programming
Dragon Television original programming